Security Printing and Minting Organization (SPMO) is a subsidiary of the Central Bank of Iran responsible for design, production and elimination of banknotes and coinage in Iran under the exclusive authority.

Founded in 1877 as the sole national mint (zarrabḵana) of Iran, it replaced multiple provincial mints. It was constructed at the place of a former cotton factory in northern Tehran, and used French machinery while the original building was built by the Belgians. Senior Münze Österreich official, Franz Pechan von Prägenberg, contributed to technically operate the mint. In 1931, Germans provided the mint with new machinery.

Iranian banknotes were not printed by the organization until 1982; instead they were outsourced abroad to Bradbury Wilkinson and Company, Waterlow and Sons, American Bank Notes Co and De La Rue. Koenig & Bauer reportedly refused to provide the organization with equipment in 2012.

References

External links
Security Printing and Minting Organization

Banknote printing companies
Mints (currency)
Bullion dealers
1877 establishments in Iran
Manufacturing companies established in 1877
Manufacturing companies based in Tehran